This article lists the songs and artists that have won Melodifestivalen, the Swedish preselection for the Eurovision Song Contest. There was no competition in 1964, 1970, and 1976. Due to the COVID-19 pandemic in Europe, 2020 marked the first year that the winning song of Melodifestivalen ("Move" performed by The Mamas) was unable to compete in that year's Eurovision Song Contest.

List of winners

Notes

References

Melodifestival-vinnare . SVT.se. Retrieved on 16 August 2008.

Lists of award winners
Lists of Swedish people